Cape May Point is a borough located at the tip of the Cape May Peninsula in Cape May County and is the southernmost point in the U.S. state of New Jersey. It is part of the Ocean City metropolitan statistical area. As of the 2020 United States census, the borough's population was 305, an increase of 14 (+4.8%) from the 2010 census count of 291, which in turn reflected an increase of 50 (+20.7%) from the 241 counted in the 2000 Census. The summer population can reach 4,500.

The Cape May Light is located in Lower Township, but is also a point of identity for Cape May Point as it uses the lighthouse as a logo for municipal-owned vehicles. Mayors of the two municipalities previously had a conflict over in which municipality it was located.

Cape May Point is a dry town, one of three municipalities in Cape May County where alcohol is not permitted to be sold by law. Cape May Point, Ocean City and Wildwood Crest are Cape May County's only remaining dry municipalities.

History
Cape May Point was called Stites Beach until 1876 when the name was changed to Seagrove. It was incorporated as a borough by an act of the New Jersey Legislature on April 19, 1878, from portions of Lower Township, based on the results of a referendum held three days earlier. It was reincorporated on August 19, 1891 and returned to Lower Township on April 8, 1896. Cape May Point re-emerged as an independent municipality on April 6, 1908, based on the results of a referendum held on April 21, 1908. The borough's name derives from Cape May, which was named for 1620 Dutch captain named Cornelius Jacobsen May who explored and charted the area between 1611–1614, and established a claim for the province of New Netherland.

The remains of SS Atlantus World War I-era concrete ship are located of the coast of Cape May Point, next to Sunset Beach.

Geography

According to the United States Census Bureau, the borough had a total area of 0.31 square miles (0.81 km2), including 0.30 square miles (0.76 km2) of land and 0.02 square miles (0.05 km2) of water (5.81%).

Cape May Point borders Lower Township, the Atlantic Ocean and Delaware Bay.

Cityscape
In 2004, the borough had about 600 houses. Circa 2004 prices of housing increased, and in 2004 a four bedroom house typically had a price of $1 million.

In 2021 the median price of a house is $1,090,000, which was the highest of any municipality on Cape Island. Most houses are on  lots and are below  in area due to the borough's zoning regulations. Julie Lasky of The New York Times wrote that "the houses appear relatively modest", and that the borough "lacks the fanciful architecture of Cape May".

In 2004 the only two businesses in Cape May Point were the Cape May Bird Observatory bird shop and the Cape May Point General Store.

Demographics

2010 census

The Census Bureau's 2006–2010 American Community Survey showed that (in 2010 inflation-adjusted dollars) median household income was $51,250 (with a margin of error of +/− $36,659) and the median family income was $71,875 (+/− $10,854). Males had a median income of $108,125 (+/− $225,840) versus $ (+/− $) for females. The per capita income for the borough was $37,269 (+/− $13,473). About 8.7% of families and 9.4% of the population were below the poverty line, including none of those under age 18 and 12.7% of those age 65 or over.

2000 census
As of the 2000 United States census there were 241 people, 133 households, and 77 families residing in the borough. The racial makeup of the borough was 95.02% White, 2.07% African American, 0.41% Asian, and 2.49% from two or more races. Hispanic or Latino of any race were 1.66% of the population.

There were 133 households, out of which 6.8% had children under the age of 18 living with them, 54.1% were married couples living together, 3.8% had a female householder with no husband present, and 41.4% were non-families. 35.3% of all households were made up of individuals, and 23.3% had someone living alone who was 65 years of age or older. The average household size was 1.81 and the average family size was 2.27.

In the borough the population was spread out, with 6.6% under the age of 18, 0.8% from 18 to 24, 10.4% from 25 to 44, 34.4% from 45 to 64, and 47.7% who were 65 years of age or older. The median age was 64 years. For every 100 females, there were 95.9 males. For every 100 females age 18 and over, there were 89.1 males.

The median income for a household in the borough was $55,313, and the median income for a family was $69,750. Males had a median income of $63,250 versus $30,833 for females. The per capita income for the borough was $52,689. None of the families and 1.7% of the population were living below the poverty line.

Government

Local government

Cape May Point operates under the Walsh Act commission form of government, first created to rebuild the city of Galveston, Texas after the devastating Hurricane of 1900. Cape May Point is one of 30 (of the 564) municipalities statewide to use this form of government, most in shore communities, down from a peak of 60 early in the 20th century. In three-member Commissions, as in Cape May Point, the Departments of Public Affairs and Public Safety are combined, as are the Departments of Public Works and Parks and Public Property. Revenue and Finance is the third portfolio. The borough adopted this form of government in 1916. The governing body is comprised of three commissioners, who are elected at-large on a non-partisan basis in the November general election to serve concurrent four-year terms of office. Cape May Point shifted its municipal elections from May to November, extending the term-end dates from June 30 to December 31 for the commissioners elected in 2012.
The Commissioners exercise complete control of the operation of the borough, with each Commissioner having all aspects of Administrative, Executive, Judicial, and Legislative powers over their department. The three Commissioners choose a mayor from among themselves at a reorganization meeting following each election, with the mayor responsible for leading municipal meetings and general oversight of community affairs.

, the members of the Board of Commissioners of Cape May Point are 
Mayor Robert J. Moffatt (Commissioner of Public Affairs and Public Safety)
Deputy Mayor Anita vanHeeswyk (Commissioner of Revenue and Finance) and 
Catherine Busch (Commissioner of Public Works), all serving concurrent terms of office ending December 31, 2024.

In October 2013, Robert Mullock was appointed to fill the vacant seat of George "Skip" Stanger, who had resigned citing health reasons. In the November 2014 general election, Mullock was elected to serve the balance of the unexpired term.

Federal, state and county representation

Cape May Point is located in the 2nd Congressional District and is part of New Jersey's 1st state legislative district.

Politics
As of March 2011, there were a total of 212 registered voters in Cape May Point, of which 99 (46.7%) were registered as Republicans, 63 (29.7%) were registered as Democrats, and 50 (23.6%) were registered as Unaffiliated. There were no voters registered to other parties.

In the 2012 presidential election, Democrat Barack Obama received 52.0% of the vote (91 cast), ahead of Republican Mitt Romney with 47.4% (83 votes), and other candidates with 0.6% (1 vote), among the 176 ballots cast by the borough's 225 registered voters (1 ballot was spoiled), for a turnout of 78.2%. In the 2008 presidential election, Democrat Barack Obama received 53.9% of the vote (103 cast), ahead of Republican John McCain, who received 44.5% (85 votes), with 191 ballots cast among the borough's 203 registered voters, for a turnout of 94.1%. In the 2004 presidential election, Democrat John Kerry received 53.3% of the vote (114 ballots cast), outpolling Republican George W. Bush, who received around 45.8% (98 votes), with 214 ballots cast among the borough's 237 registered voters, for a turnout percentage of 90.3.

In the 2013 gubernatorial election, Republican Chris Christie received 66.9% of the vote (85 cast), ahead of Democrat Barbara Buono with 30.7% (39 votes), and other candidates with 2.4% (3 votes), among the 129 ballots cast by the borough's 209 registered voters (2 ballots were spoiled), for a turnout of 61.7%. In the 2009 gubernatorial election, Republican Chris Christie received 47.0% of the vote (79 ballots cast), ahead of both Democrat Jon Corzine with 43.5% (73 votes) and Independent Chris Daggett with 9.5% (16 votes), with 168 ballots cast among the borough's 220 registered voters, yielding a 76.4% turnout.

Law enforcement and public safety
Cape May Point Volunteer Fire Department provides fire department services. The spring 1908 Lankenau Villa fire prompted Cape May Point officials to ask for a fire department to be organized the following July, and the borough had two fire carts by 1911. In 1923 a borough ordinance allowed the Cape May Point Volunteer Fire Department to be established, with a truck and fire station acquired and established, respectively, in 1924.

Cape May Point currently relies on Cape May City and West Cape May Borough police for patrols. From the establishment of Cape May Point borough it had an independent police department using ordinary residents filling in as "special" police instead of salaried police, although eventually its police department was reformed into a standard one. Cape May Point began contracting with West Cape May Police in 1986 and with Cape May City police in 2001.

Cape May Point, upon incorporation, had a one-room jail. Joe Jordan, author of Cape May Point, The Illustrated History-1875 to the Present, stated that "if one is to believe local gossip" that the jail likely served as a drunk tank, and Jordan wrote that it "may have held several world's records as the smallest jail, with the fewest inmates, and the shortest periods of incarceration." The borough put the facility for sale in 1927 but rejected the sole bid and turned it into storage for the fire department after moving it behind the current fire station location. It was moved to Historic Cold Spring Village in Cold Spring in 1983.

Infrastructure
Cape May Point began using Cape May City's water system  as Cape May Point's well water system was near the maximum salt content allowed under New Jersey law. The water distribution system was rebuilt in the 1980s and 1990s, and a new water tank replaced the previous one in 1995, with the former water tank dismantled. Its water costs increased when Cape May City built a desalinization plant in the late 1990s. 

The Cape May Point Water and Sewer Utility, created in 1980, is an agency that is separate from the Cape May Point borough government. A sewage treatment plant opened in 1938, but it put untreated sewage into the water, so Cape May Point agreed to use Cape May City sewage facilities after the New Jersey Department of Health in October 1941 demanded that Cape May Point change its practices with a fine as possible punishment. Cape May Point also helped pay for a new sewage plant Cape May City opened .

Education

Cape May Point School District is a non-operating school district, with all students sent to schools outside of the district. It opened a two story grade 1–8 school in the 1870. It began sending students to Lower Township School District in 1931 and closed the former school, which is now a house. Cape May Point under Frank Rutherford, the mayor, chose not to join the Lower Cape May Regional School District when it was formed. The borough never joined a regional school system. Therefore, in 2004, it had among the lowest property tax rates in New Jersey.

For pre-kindergarten through sixth grade, public school students attend Cape May City Elementary School in Cape May City, as part of a sending/receiving relationship with the Cape May City School District. Most students in the Cape May elementary district come from the United States Coast Guard Training Center Cape May. As of the 2021–22 school year, the district, comprised of one school, had an enrollment of 169 students and 22.6 classroom teachers (on an FTE basis), for a student–teacher ratio of 7.5:1. Starting in 2010, discussions were under way regarding a possible consolidation of the districts of Cape May City, Cape May Point and the West Cape May School District.

For seventh through twelfth grades, public school students attend the schools of the Lower Cape May Regional School District, which serves students from Cape May City, Cape May Point, Lower Township and West Cape May. Schools in the district (with 2021–22 enrollment data from the National Center for Education Statistics) are
Richard M. Teitelman Middle School with 439 students in grades 7-8 and
Lower Cape May Regional High School (LCMRHS) with 764 students in grades 9-12.

Students are also eligible to attend Cape May County Technical High School in Cape May Court House, which serves students from the entire county in its comprehensive and vocational programs, which are offered without charge to students who are county residents. Special needs students may be referred to Cape May County Special Services School District in the Cape May Court House area.

Transportation

No Interstate, U.S., state or major county highways serve Cape May Point. The most significant roads in the borough are minor county routes, such as County Route 629.

Climate
According to the Köppen climate classification system, Cape May Point, New Jersey has a humid subtropical climate (Cfa) with hot, moderately humid summers, cool winters and year-around precipitation. Cfa climates are characterized by all months having an average mean temperature > , at least four months with an average mean temperature ≥ , at least one month with an average mean temperature ≥  and no significant precipitation difference between seasons. During the summer months in Cape May Point, a cooling afternoon sea breeze is present on most days, but episodes of extreme heat and humidity can occur with heat index values ≥ . During the winter months, episodes of extreme cold and wind can occur with wind chill values < .

Ecology
According to the A. W. Kuchler U.S. potential natural vegetation types, Cape May Point would have a dominant vegetation type of Northern Cordgrass (73) with a dominant vegetation form of Coastal Prairie (20).

Religion
The Sisters of St. Joseph maintain the Queen of the Sea facility, a convent called the Saint Joseph House, and a retreat facility called Saint Mary by-the-Sea. Bill Barlow of the Press of Atlantic City wrote that it is "A beloved local landmark". Its facilities are not connected with the Roman Catholic Diocese of Camden.

Saint Mary opened as the Shoreham Hotel in 1889. Due to business failure it became a nursing home for African Americans in 1898, known as Home for Aged and Infirm Colored People. It later closed, and the sisters spent $9,000 to buy the property in 1909, which it called Saint Mary. In 2016 the sisters announced that they intended to close Saint Mary. The COVID-19 pandemic in New Jersey, starting in 2020, meant that the group could no longer hold retreats there, and in 2021 the order announced Saint Mary was closing. In 2018 the order stated that upon closure St. Mary's should be demolished. In 2021 the order did not anticipate demolishing the facility.

Parks and recreation
The "Miss Cape May Point" contest was held in the borough.

Notable people

People who were born in, residents of, or otherwise closely associated with Cape May Point include:

 Benjamin Harrison (1833–1901), 23rd President of the United States from 1889 to 1893, who was given a cottage in Cape May Point in 1890 by John Wanamaker and his associates
 Mary O'Hara (1885–1980), author known for her novel My Friend Flicka
 Bill Pilczuk (born 1971), swimmer
 David Allen Sibley (born 1961), ornithologist who is the author and illustrator of The Sibley Guide to Birds
 John Wanamaker (1838–1922), retailer

Gallery

References

Reference notes

Further reading

External links

 
Boroughs in Cape May County, New Jersey
Jersey Shore communities in Cape May County
New Jersey District Factor Group none
Populated places established in 1878
1878 establishments in New Jersey
Walsh Act